The 1994–95 Slovenian Ice Hockey League was the fourth season of Slovenia's hockey league.

At the end of the regular season the playoffs were held. Olimpija were the winners.

Teams
Bled
Celje
Jesenice
Maribor
Olimpija
Slavija
Triglav Kranj

First part of the season

Second part of the season
The top four teams in part two went on to the playoffs, while the bottom three determined the final three places.

Play-offs

Semi-finals
Olimpija defeated Bled in a best of 7 series 6–1, 3–1, 4–2 and 6–2

Jesenice defeated Celje, as Celje forfeited all their matches.

Final
Olimpija defeated Jesenice 4–3 in a best of seven series.
Olimpija – Jesenice 2-4 (1–1, 1–2, 0–1)
Jesenice – Olimpija 1–0 (0–0, 0–0, 1–0)
Olimpija – Jesenice 5–1 (1–1, 1–0, 3–0)
Jesenice – Olimpija 3–4 a.p. (1–0, 1–1, 0–1, 1–2)
Olimpija – Jesenice 6–4 (1–1, 3–2, 2–1)
Jesenice – Olimpija 1–5 (1–1, 0–2, 0–2)

Third place
Bled defeated Celje via a forfeit.

Fifth to Seventh place

External links
Slovenian league 1994–95

1994–95 in Slovenian ice hockey
Slovenia
Slovenian Ice Hockey League seasons